Outward holiness, or external holiness, is a Wesleyan–Arminian doctrine emphasizing modest dress and sober speech. It is a testimony of a Christian believer's regeneration, done in obedience to God. The doctrine is prevalent among denominations emerging during the revival movements, including the Methodists (especially those in the Holiness Movement), as well as Pentecostals. It is taken from 1 Peter 1:15: "He which hath called you is Holy, so be ye holy in all manner of conversation."

History

In , Adam and Eve tried to cover their nakedness, though their attempt was inadequate for God; this reflects the tendency in humans to "invent inadequate coverings for our nakedness."  and  teach that Jehovah properly clothed humans and that a "fully-clothed person is a God-ordained symbol of the full clothing of Christ's righteousness."  and  teach that nakedness is inclusive of anything that includes the torso and thighs. As taught in the early Christian text Paedagogus, the early Church stressed the importance of wearing modest clothing in the practice of Christianity, with the Church Father Clement of Alexandria declaring in it:

More specifically, with regard to proper apparel, Clement of Alexandria commanded:

The Paedagogus teaches against the wearing of extravagant clothing, in addition to forbidding the wearing of jewelry. It emphasizes instead, that people should seek piety. In the same vein, the Didascalia Apostolorum, an early Christian manual, directed: "Thou therefore who art a Christian [woman]… if thou wishest to be faithful, please thy husband only, and when thou walkest in the market-place, cover thy head with thy garment, that by thy veil the greatness of thy beauty may be covered; do not adorn the face of thine eyes, but look down and walk veiled; be watchful, not to wash in the baths with men." 

Reviving these early Christian teachings on modesty as an integral part of Christian living, the founder of the Methodist Churches—John Wesley—emphasized "inward and outward holiness", which "emphasized the essential link between heart holiness and holy living." Outward holiness in the form of "right living and right actions" is practiced in obedience to God and as a testimony of faith after a person experiences the New Birth.

Early Methodists wore plain dress, with Methodist clergy condemning "high headdresses, ruffles, laces, gold, and 'costly apparel' in general". John Wesley, the founder of the Methodist movement, recommended that Methodists read his thoughts On Dress, in which he detailed acceptable types and colors of fabrics, in addition to "shapes and sizes of hats, coats, sleeves, and hairstyles"; in that sermon, John Wesley expressed his desire for Methodists: "Let me see, before I die, a Methodist congregation, full as plain dressed as a Quaker congregation." He also taught, with respect to Christian headcovering, that women, "especially in a religious assembly", should "keep on her veil". Those who tried to attend Methodist services in costly apparel were denied admittance. The 1858 Discipline of the Wesleyan Methodist Connection stated that "we would not only enjoin on all who fear God plain dress, but we would recommend to our preachers and people, according to Mr. Wesley's views expressed in his sermon on the inefficiency of Christianity, published but a few years before his death, and containing his matured judgment, distinguishing plainness—Plainness which will publicly comment them to the maintenance of their Christian profession wherever they may be." The "men among the Methodists all wore the low-crowned hat with a broad brim, and a shad-bellied coat, much after the fashion of a Quaker coat, and their women wore generally a long scoop black silk bonnet, plain, without any gay trimmings, plain dress and no ear-rings, nor any kind of ornaments". The 1859 novel Adam Bede portrayed the Methodist itinerant preacher, Dinah Morris, wearing plain dress, with the words "I saw she was a Methodist, or Quaker, or something of that sort, by her dress". In the 14 April 1903 edition of The Free Methodist, an article on "Woman in the Public Service" written by a bishop of the Free Methodist Church (a Methodist denomination aligned with the holiness movement), Walter Ashbel Sellew, taught the importance of the woman's headcovering and modest dress:  Peter Cartwright, a Methodist revivalist, emphasized the importance of outward holiness in the history of Methodism, stating:

While few wear plain dress in mainline Methodism today, some Methodist Churches of the conservative holiness movement, such as the Allegheny Wesleyan Methodist Connection and Evangelical Wesleyan Church, continue to dress modestly and plainly, also avoiding the wearing of jewelry (sometimes inclusive of wedding rings). The Fellowship of Independent Methodist Churches continues the practice of headcovering. The 2015 Discipline of the Evangelical Wesleyan Church details these holiness standards in its General Rules:

In its Special Rules and Advices, the Evangelical Wesleyan Church further teaches that:

The same denomination, in its 2018 Handbook for the Evangelical Wesleyan Bible Institute (EWBI), teaches the following "Principles of Christian Living" for its seminary students:

The Book of Discipline of the Calvary Holiness Church specifies the standard for the headcovering worn by Christian women:

The Methodist doctrine of outward holiness applies to Home Furnishing as well, with the Metropolitan Church Association teaching:

Standards
Holiness Methodist doctrine teaches that biblical standards of dress and behaviour are followed "an act of obedience and they keep one from nullifying his testimony of grace", being required for all Christians after the first work of grace—regeneration.

The father of Methodism John Wesley's view of biblical standards was further grounded in the principle of stewardship—dressing plainly so that money could go to help the needy: "Everything about thee which cost more than Christian duty required thee to lay out is the blood of the poor!" Methodist evangelist Phoebe Palmer wrote the following prayer of consecration for those seeking to be entirely sanctified, which "involves a submitting to any behavioral standards which might be enjoined upon the believer by God":
 Daniel Stafford, a Nazarene evangelist, preached that those not adhering to biblical standards of dress and behaviour are not even candidates for the second work of grace: "It would be an insult to the blessed Holy Ghost to ask Him to house a body that is decked out with the things of the world". The 2012 Book of Discipline of the African Methodist Episcopal Zion Church teaches the following standards that are typical of traditional Methodist practice:

 Many of the following standards are those practiced by those who adhere to the doctrine of outward holiness, though certain connexions have relaxed them, especially those in the mainline tradition:

Modest and plain dress (1 Tim. 2:9), which is defined as loose covering from the neck to below the knee in all normal body postures (Exod. 20:26; 28:42-43) with women's styles including cape dresses and prairie dresses for example; women often wear a Christian headcovering. This would include the wearing of swimming dresses by women rather than revealing bathing suits, as well as the strict prohibition of mixed bathing.
Moderate or no use of jewelry or ornaments of gold, silver, and jewels for personal adornment (1 Tim. 2:9-10; 1 Pet. 3:1-6); some denominations will only allow the use of a wedding band or ring while others proscribe it too.
A distinction of the sexes in clothing, forbidding such style as trousers and pant suits for women even if required by work or public service. (Deut. 22:5).
Christian men are to wear their hair short and Christian women must never cut or remove their hair, wearing it long in order to have a definitive distinction of male and female sexes. (1 Cor. 11:14-15).

Outward Holiness can also include the following which reveal an inward character:
 Impeccable honesty (Prov. 11:1; Rom. 12:7)
 Civil obedience (Rom. 13:1-7)
 Subjection to parental authority (Eph. 6:1)
 Submission to the spiritual authority (Heb. 13:17)
 No profanity or vulgar joking or explicit conversation (Eph. 4:29; 5:4; Col. 3:8)
 Keeping the Ten Commandments, such as observing the Christian Sabbath (John 14:15; 1 John 2:3-4; Heb. 10:25)
 Regular prayer and fasting (Acts 14:21-23)
 Abstinence from alcohol and other drugs (Prov. 20:1; Rom. 13:13; Eph. 5:18; 1 Thes. 5:7-8)
 Avoidance of social dances (Rom. 13:11-14; Gal. 5:19-21)

Observing denominations
Outward Holiness is a part of Wesleyan-Arminian (Methodist) theology and practice, being inherited in many Holiness Pentecostal traditions. It is usually practiced with a family or similar environmental or community beliefs. Denominations that observe Outward Holiness are:

Methodist (inclusive of the holiness movement)
Allegheny Wesleyan Methodist Connection
Bible Methodist Connection of Churches
Bible Holiness Church
Bible Missionary Church
Emmanuel Association of Churches
Evangelical Wesleyan Church
Fellowship of Independent Methodist Churches 
God's Missionary Church
Wesleyan Holiness Alliance
Wesleyan Holiness Association of Churches

Holiness Pentecostal
Apostolic Faith Church
Free Gospel Church and Free Gospel Bible Institute 
Fire-Baptized Holiness Church
Free Holiness

Finished Work Pentecostal
New Testament Christian Churches of America (few)

Oneness Pentecostal
Apostolic Assembly of the Faith in Christ Jesus 
Assemblies of the Lord Jesus Christ
Church of Our Lord Jesus Christ of the Apostolic Faith 
Church of the Lord Jesus Christ
Gospel Assembly Churches 
Pentecostal Assemblies of the World 
United Pentecostal Church

Restorationist
Church of God (Anderson, Indiana) (few)
Church of God (Guthrie, Oklahoma)
Church of God (Restoration)

Conservative Anabaptist and Old Order Anabaptist communities from the Amish, Apostolic Christian, Bruderhof, Charity Christian, Hutterite, Mennonite, Schwarzenau Brethren and River Brethren traditions are considered plain people for their simple lifestyle and plain dress, which includes Christian headcoverings for women. Likewise, Quakers of the Conservative Friends and Holiness Friends traditions practice a testimony of simplicity. As these Churches have a different origin than those of the Wesleyan-Arminian tradition, they do not call this outward holiness although their beliefs often produce the same externals as those of the Wesleyan-Arminian tradition, e.g. plain dress; the Calvary Holiness Church, a River Brethren denomination that was influenced by the holiness movement, is an exception given its dual theological roots. Other people with a similar lifestyle include the Plymouth Brethren, the communicants of the Laestadian Lutheran Churches, and some Reformed denominations, such as the Free Presbyterian Church of Scotland and the Netherlands Reformed Congregations. Congregants in Independent Baptist churches are also known for their modest dress. Some Traditionalist Catholics, such as the communicants of the Palmarian Catholic Church, follow a full time modesty dress code known as "Marylike" standards, said to have been laid down by an unnamed cardinal who had visions from the Virgin Mary during the reign of Pope Pius XI (this too produces modesty externals similar to those in the Wesleyan-Arminian tradition).

See also 

Works of Piety
Works of Mercy
Growth in grace
Nonconformity to the world
Plain people

References

Further reading

External links
What the Early Christians Believed About Modest Dress & Cosmetics - Scroll Publishing Company
What the Early Christians Believed About The Head Covering - Scroll Publishing Company

Methodism
Christian ethics in the Bible
Christian terminology